Behold the Lamb of God is the fifth album by the American singer/songwriter Andrew Peterson. Released in 2004, it is composed of original Christmas songs.

Each December, Peterson travels the country with fellow musicians to present Behold the Lamb of God. The first half of the concert is spent storytelling songs with each guest artist on the tour. The second half is spent performing this Christmas album sequentially from beginning to end. The tour culminates in an annual performance in the Ryman Auditorium in Nashville. Guest artists who have participated in past shows include Nickel Creek, Ron Block, Garett Buell, Caleb Chapman of Colony House, Thad Cockrell, Cason Cooley, Jason Gray, Sara Groves, Andy Gullahorn, Brandon Heath, Ellie Holcomb, Jenny & Tyler, Matthew Perryman Jones, Phil Keaggy, Alison Krauss, Phil Madeira, Sandra McCracken, Buddy Miller, Cindy Morgan, Jonathan & Amanda Noël, Bebo Norman, Fernando Ortega, Andrew Osenga, Eric Peters, Pierce Pettis, Jill Phillips, Gabe Scott, Ben Shive, Derek Webb and David Wilcox.

A new edition of the album was released on October 25, 2019.

Track listing
All songs by Andrew Peterson unless otherwise noted.
 "Gather 'Round, Ye Children, Come" – 3:18
 "Passover Us" – 4:33
 "So Long, Moses" – 6:13
 "Deliver Us" – 3:50
 "O Come, O Come Emmanuel" – 2:31
 "Matthew's Begats" – 2:17
 "It Came to Pass" – 2:50
 "Labor of Love" (featuring Jill Phillips) – 4:32
 "The Holly and the Ivy" (Ben Shive) – 1:53
 "While Shepherds Watched Their Flocks" (Nahum Tate) – 3:23
 "Behold the Lamb of God" (Andrew Peterson, Laura Story) – 4:02
 "The Theme of My Song (reprise)" – 4:21

References

2004 albums
Andrew Peterson (musician) albums
Fervent Records albums